In mathematics, matrix addition is the operation of adding two matrices by adding the corresponding entries together. 

For a vector, adding two matrices would have the geometric effect of applying each matrix transformation separately onto , then adding the transformed vectors.

However, there are other operations that could also be considered addition for matrices, such as the direct sum and the Kronecker sum.

Entrywise sum
Two matrices must have an equal number of rows and columns to be added. In which case, the sum of two matrices A and B will be a matrix which has the same number of rows and columns as A and B. The sum of A and B, denoted , is computed by adding corresponding elements of A and B:

Or more concisely (assuming that ):

For example:

Similarly, it is also possible to subtract one matrix from another, as long as they have the same dimensions. The difference of A and B, denoted , is computed by subtracting elements of B from corresponding elements of A, and has the same dimensions as A and B. For example:

Direct sum
Another operation, which is used less often, is the direct sum (denoted by ⊕). The Kronecker sum is also denoted ⊕; the context should make the usage clear. The direct sum of any pair of matrices A of size m × n and B of size p × q is a matrix of size (m + p) × (n + q) defined as:

For instance,

The direct sum of matrices is a special type of block matrix. In particular, the direct sum of square matrices is a block diagonal matrix.

The adjacency matrix of the union of disjoint graphs (or multigraphs) is the direct sum of their adjacency matrices. Any element in the direct sum of two vector spaces of matrices can be represented as a direct sum of two matrices.

In general, the direct sum of n matrices is:

where the zeros are actually blocks of zeros (i.e., zero matrices).

Kronecker sum

The Kronecker sum is different from the direct sum, but is also denoted by ⊕. It is defined using the Kronecker product ⊗ and normal matrix addition. If A is n-by-n, B is m-by-m and    denotes the k-by-k identity matrix then the Kronecker sum is defined by:

See also
 Matrix multiplication
 Vector addition

Notes

References

External links

 Abstract nonsense: Direct Sum of Linear Transformations and Direct Sum of Matrices
 Mathematics Source Library: Arithmetic Matrix Operations
 Matrix Algebra and R

Linear algebra
Bilinear maps